Rubert Martínez Texidor (born July 16, 1985) is a male judoka from Cuba, who won the silver medal in the men's lightweight division (– 73 kg) at the 2003 Pan American Games. He represented his native country at the  2004 Summer Olympics in Athens, Greece, where he was defeated in the first round.

References
sports-reference

1985 births
Living people
Judoka at the 2004 Summer Olympics
Judoka at the 2003 Pan American Games
Olympic judoka of Cuba
Cuban male judoka
Pan American Games silver medalists for Cuba
Pan American Games medalists in judo
Medalists at the 2003 Pan American Games